Lieutenant General John B. Conaway (born August 23, 1934) is a retired United States Air Force officer who served as Chief of the National Guard Bureau from 1990 to 1993.

Early life
John B. Conaway was born in Henderson, Kentucky, on August 23, 1934. He graduated from Bosse High School in Evansville, Indiana, in 1952, earned a Bachelor of Science degree in business administration from the University of Evansville in 1956, and joined the Lambda Chi Alpha fraternity.

Military career
While attending the University of Evansville, Conaway entered the Reserve Officer Training Corps program and was commissioned as a second lieutenant in the United States Air Force in June 1956.

After completing basic pilot training at Greenville Air Force Base, Mississippi, in 1957, Conaway attended advanced combat crew training at Perrin Air Force Base, Texas, graduating in 1958. His next assignments were as an F-102 fighter-interceptor pilot in the Air Defense Command at K.I. Sawyer Air Force Base and Kincheloe Air Force Base, Michigan.

In 1960, Conaway joined the West Virginia Air National Guard as an SA-16 pilot, flying a special forces operations mission.  In 1963, he transferred to the Kentucky Air National Guard's 123rd Tactical Reconnaissance Wing as an RB-57 pilot. In 1965 he became a training instructor flying RF-101s.

Conaway was called to active duty with the Kentucky Air National Guard in January 1968 and served in Alaska, Panama, Japan and South Korea. Upon deactivation in June 1969, he returned to the Kentucky Air National Guard as operations officer.

In 1972, Conaway was appointed Air Commander of the Kentucky Air National Guard.  In December 1974, he was appointed vice commander of the 123rd Tactical Reconnaissance Wing, which had units in Kentucky, Arkansas, Nevada and Idaho. Other assignments included serving as the 123rd's director of operations, chief of safety, chief of standardization and evaluation, group commander, group deputy commander for operations, and squadron operations officer.

Conaway continued graduate work at the University of Louisville School of Business and the University of Kentucky School of Business.  In 1975, he earned a master's degree in management and human relations from Webster University. He graduated from the Air Force Commander's Safety School in 1969, Air Command and Staff College in 1971, Air University Commander's School in 1972 and the Industrial College of the Armed Forces in 1973.

Conaway was appointed deputy director of the Air National Guard in April 1977.  In April 1981 he was advanced to Director of the Air National Guard.

In July 1988 Conaway was appointed Vice Chief of the National Guard Bureau. He served until February 1990, when he was appointed as Chief of the National Guard Bureau and promoted to lieutenant general.

Conaway served as Chief of the National Guard Bureau until retiring on November 30, 1993.

Retirement
Conaway operates a consulting company, The Conaway Group.

In 1989 he was elected to the University of Evansville Board of Trustees, and he became a Life Trustee in 2007.

He has also remained active in civic causes, including serving as chairman of the board for the National Guard Youth Foundation.

In 1997 Conaway authored Call Out the Guard: The Story of Lieutenant General John B. Conaway and the Modern Day National Guard.

Awards and decorations

Military awards and decorations
Conaway's military awards and decorations include the:

 Defense Distinguished Service Medal
 Air Force Distinguished Service Medal
 Army Distinguished Service Medal
 Legion of Merit
 Meritorious Service Medal
 Air Force Commendation Medal
 Army Commendation Medal
 Air Force Outstanding Unit Award with oak leaf cluster
 Air Force Organizational Excellence Award
 Combat Readiness Medal with three oak leaf clusters
 Air Force Recognition Ribbon
 National Defense Service Medal with service star
 Armed Forces Expeditionary Medal
 Air Force Longevity Service Award Ribbon with four oak leaf clusters
 Armed Forces Reserve Medal with two hourglass devices
 Small Arms Expert Marksmanship Ribbon
 Air Force Training Ribbon
 Kentucky Distinguished Service Medal

Other awards

Eugene M. Zuckert Management Award, U.S. Air Force
Citation of Honor, U.S. Air Force Association
Exceptional Service Award, Selective Service System
Order of the Sword,  Air National Guard
Honorary Doctor of Laws degree, University of Evansville
Montgomery Medal, National Guard Association of the United States, 2007
Robert W. Crawford Achievement Prize, National Recreation Foundation

References

Further reading

Attribution

External links

 National Guard Bureau Biography of Lieutenant General John B. Conaway

1934 births
Living people
People from Evansville, Indiana
University of Evansville alumni
Webster University alumni
Air Command and Staff College alumni
Dwight D. Eisenhower School for National Security and Resource Strategy alumni
Recipients of the Defense Distinguished Service Medal
Recipients of the Air Force Distinguished Service Medal
Recipients of the Legion of Merit
United States Air Force generals
National Guard (United States) generals
Recipients of the Order of the Sword (United States)
Chiefs of the National Guard Bureau
West Virginia National Guard personnel
Recipients of the Distinguished Service Medal (US Army)